Kiteenjärvi is a medium-sized lake in North Karelia region in Finland.

See also
List of lakes in Finland

References

Lakes of Kitee